Sinibrama melrosei is a species of ray-finned fish in the genus Sinibrama. It is found in southern China (Yunnan, Guangxi, Guangdong, Hong Kong, Hainan), Vietnam, and Laos. It inhabits rivers.

References 

Sinibrama
Freshwater fish of China
Fish of Laos
Fish of Vietnam
Fauna of Hong Kong
Fish described in 1927